You Yuanwen (Chinese: 由元文 born 23 April 1986) is a Chinese football player who currently plays for Sichuan Longfor in the China League One.

Club career
You Yuanwen started his career playing for the top-tier side Henan Jianye during the 2007 league season and was eventually  given his chance to make his senior league debut for the club when the manager Jia Xiuquan let him come on as a late substitute for Xiao Zhi on March 30, 2008, against Beijing Guoan in a 2–0 defeat. After making several further substitute appearances he was unable to make an impact on the pitch and was soon dropped from the team. However, he still remain with the club for several further seasons and saw a succession of managers come through the club before Jo Bonfrere decided to release him at the end of the 2010 league season.

Halfway through the 2011 league season top-tier side Shanghai Shenhua decided to bring You Yuanwen in on a free transfer after the club needed a striker after losing Duvier Riascos and Dong Xuesheng to other teams as well as Luis Salmerón to injury. You Yuanwen made his debut for the club on August 6, 2011, against Henan Jianye in a 2–1 defeat where he came on as substitute for Feng Renliang.

References

External links
Player profile at Sodasoccer.com
Player stats at Sohu.com

1986 births
Living people
Chinese footballers
Footballers from Dalian
Henan Songshan Longmen F.C. players
Shanghai Shenhua F.C. players
Qingdao F.C. players
Sichuan Longfor F.C. players
Chinese Super League players
Association football utility players